Rugolo Plays Kenton (subtitled The Pete Rugolo Orchestra Plays Compositions Introduced by Stan Kenton) is an album by composer, arranger and conductor Pete Rugolo featuring performances of tunes associated with Stan Kenton recorded in 1958 and first released on the Mercury label.

Reception

The Allmusic review by Scott Yanow noted: "Since Pete Rugolo came to fame for his many arrangements for the Stan Kenton Orchestra and this was one of his last important jazz albums before he became largely a full-time writer for the studios, it seems only proper that the date finds Rugolo paying tribute to his former boss. ... Rugolo does not merely re-create the past but instead comes up with fresh variations".

Track listing
All compositions by Stan Kenton except where noted.
 "Eager Beaver" - 3:00
 "Painted Rhythm" - 3:46
 "Minor Riff" (Kenton, Rugolo) - 2:34
 "Concerto for Doghouse" - 2:43
 "Sunset Tower" - 2:27
 "Concerto to End All Concertos" - 5:21
 "Artistry in Rhythm" - 3:50
 "Southern Scandal" - 3:22
 "Opus in Pastels" - 3:02
 "Theme to the West" (Kenton, Rugolo) - 2:54
 "Artistry in Boogie" (Kenton, Rugolo) - 3:59
 "Capitol Punishment" (Kenton, Rugolo) - 2:24

Recorded in Los Angeles, CA on October 25, 1958 (tracks 1, 7 & 12), October 26, 1958 (tracks 2, 3, 6, 8 & 11), and November 24, 1958 (tracks 4, 5, 9 & 10).

Personnel
Pete Rugolo - arranger, conductor
Buddy Childers, Don Fagerquist, Ollie Mitchell, Al Porcino - trumpet 
Milt Bernhart, Harry Betts (tracks 1, 7 & 12), Dick Nash (tracks 2-6 & 8-11), Frank Rosolino, Kenny Shroyer - trombone 
Red Callender - tuba
Harry Klee, Bud Shank - alto saxophone, flute
Bob Cooper - tenor saxophone, oboe
Dave Pell - tenor saxophone, clarinet
Chuck Gentry - baritone saxophone, bass clarinet
Claude Williamson - piano
Howard Roberts - guitar
Don Bagley - bass
Shelly Manne - drums

References

Pete Rugolo albums
1958 albums
EmArcy Records albums
Albums arranged by Pete Rugolo
Albums conducted by Pete Rugolo